This is a list of presidents of the Federal Supreme Court of Switzerland. It includes all presiding judges of the Federal Supreme Court of Switzerland since 1848.

Until the Swiss Constitution of 1874, members of the Federal Assembly (Council of States, National Council) could be judges and many of the presidents of the Federal Supreme Court were also members of the Federal Assembly.

External links 
 Liste der ehemaligen Bundesgerichtspräsidenten

Switzerland, Federal Supreme Court, Presidents
Presidents